Aleksandr Andreyevich Yevstafyev (born 15 January 1985) is a Russian former footballer.

Club career
In 2006, he became Russian First Division winner playing for FC Khimki.

External links
 

Russian footballers
FC Khimki players
FC Baltika Kaliningrad players
1985 births
Living people
Russian Premier League players
FC Tyumen players
Association football midfielders
FC Zenit-2 Saint Petersburg players
FC Dynamo Saint Petersburg players
FC Zenit Saint Petersburg players
FC Nosta Novotroitsk players